Hurtigruten, formally Kystruten Bergen-Kirkenes ("coastal route Bergen-Kirkenes"), is a Norwegian public coastal route transporting passengers that travel locally, regionally and between the ports of call, and also cargo between ports north of Tromsø.

Hurtigruten provides daily, year-round and consistent traffic between Bergen and Kirkenes with 34 ports of call on northbound and 33 ports of call on southbound sailings. The Ministry of Transport and Communications in Norway has set minimum capacity requirements of 320 passengers, 120 berths and cargo for 150 Euro-pallets. The current agreement with the privately held company Hurtigruten AS entered into force on 1 January 2012 and expired on 31 December 2019, with an optional 1-year extension. From 2021 the two companies Hurtigruten AS and Havila Kystruten AS will operate the route.

As of April 2022, one of the ships of Havila Kystruten, MS Havila Capella, was taken out of service; because of sanctions as a result of the 2022 Invasion of Ukraine, the ship no longer had insurance; "the 4 ships of" the company were at that time financed by a Russian company.

As of March 2023, Havila Kystruten has 2 out of 4 ships in operation, Havila Capella and Havila Castor. Havila Polaris and Havila Pollux is expected to be delivered before summer 2023.

History 

Hurtigruten was established in 1893 by government contract to improve communications along Norway's long, jagged coastline.  began the first round-trip journey from Trondheim on 2 July 1893 bound for Hammerfest, with calls at Rørvik, Brønnøy, Sandnessjøen, Bodø, Svolvær, Lødingen, Harstad, Tromsø and Skjervøy. The ship arrived at Svolvær on Monday 3 July at 8pm after 35½ hours and at Hammerfest on Wednesday 5 July after 67 hours. She was commanded by founder of the route Richard With. At that time this was the fastest route between northern and southern Norway, and this resulted in the route being named Hurtigruten (express route). As of 2008, the Trondheim–Svolvær trip took 33 hours and the Trondheim–Hammerfest trip took 41 hours 15 min.

Before Hurtigruten opened, only Vesteraalens Dampskibsselskab was willing to make the trip through the then poorly-charted waters; the voyage was especially difficult during the long, dark winters. The company had for itself made detailed sailing instructions. Hurtigruten was a substantial breakthrough for communities along its path. Mail from central Norway to Hammerfest, which used to take three weeks in summer and five months in winter, could now be delivered in seven days.

Encouraged by Vesteraalens' early success, several other shipping companies obtained a concession to operate the route, extended to run between Bergen in the southwest and Kirkenes in the far northeast. A fleet of 11 ships visits each of the 34 ports daily, both northbound and southbound.

Until the 1940s most ports north of Trondheim could not be reached by road from Oslo, so the sea was the only means of access. Beginning in the 1960s, the role of Hurtigruten changed, in part because of the construction of a local airport network and road improvements. Operating subsidies were gradually phased out, and the operators put more emphasis on tourism. New, bigger and more luxurious ships were introduced in the 1980s, with attention given to hot tubs, bars, restaurants and other comforts. However, Hurtigruten still serves important passenger and cargo needs, and operates 365 days a year. The last two independent shipping companies, Ofotens og Vesteraalens Dampskibsselskab (OVDS) and Troms Fylkes Dampskibsselskap (TFDS), merged on 1 March 2006 as the Hurtigruten Group, a year later becoming Hurtigruten ASA. In 2015 Hurtigruten was delisted from the Oslo stock exchange after the company was acquired by the private equity group TDR Capital. In addition to the voyages in Norway, the company operates expedition cruises to Greenland, Canada, South America, Iceland, Svalbard and Antarctica.

New contracts
The Ministry of Transport and Communications in Norway announced in 2017 that the Hurtigruten contract was split into three contracts. The contracts were put up for bid and in the end, two were granted to Hurtigruten AS and one to Havila Kystruten AS, with each operating seven and four ships respectively. The two companies will alternate departure days for the entire route from Bergen to Kirkenes.

Havila Kystruten AS is building four new vessels to serve the route, while Hurtigruten AS will be refitting seven of its vessels to meet the stricter emissions requirements.

The four new vessels from Havila will run on LNG and battery power. LNG will cut CO₂ emissions by 25 per cent, and the battery power will yield additional savings. The vessels will be named Havila Capella, Havila Castor, Havila Polaris and Havila Pollux. All four vessels were built at Tersan shipyard in Turkey.

Existing vessels from Hurtigruten will be modernized and renovated in order to meet the new requirements. MS Eirik Raude, MS Trollfjord and MS Otto Sverdrup are all getting modernized and renovated with a scandinavian interior style similar to the expedition vessels MS Roald Amundsen and MS Fridtjof Nansen.

The ships will be fitted with filters and LNG compatible engines in order to reduce emissions by 25%. The ships will also get hybrid motors, and battery packs.

Current fleet 

As of 2020, this is a list of ships sailing on the Hurtigruten.

Places visited on coastal route
In order, northbound:

Live television broadcast

As part of its slow television series, the Norwegian Broadcasting Corporation transmitted non-stop the Hurtigruten ship 's 134-hour voyage from Bergen to Kirkenes, which started on June 16, 2011.

Post-World War II accidents and incidents

Before World War II, a number of ships perished, usually because they ran aground in bad visibility.

Most of the Hurtigruten fleet was sunk during World War II.

In September 1954  ran aground in Raftsundet at night. The ship started taking on water and eventually sank. Of the 157 passengers and 46 crew members on board, five died.

On January 8, 1958, a fire broke out on board MS Erling Jarl while the vessel was docked at Bodø. Fourteen people died of smoke inhalation. Today a memorial to the incident stands at Bodø.

On October 21, 1962 MS Sanct Svithun ran onto a reef in the maritime area Folda in Nord-Trøndelag because of a major navigational error after leaving Trondheim. Of 89 persons on board (passengers, crew and two postal officers) 41 died.

In 2011  suffered an engine room fire, leading to two deaths among the crew.

References

Notes

Bibliography

External links

 
 Hurtigruten Norway: main website
 Hurtigruten: UK site
 Hurtigruten: US site
 Hurtigruten Ship News

 
Ferry companies of Norway
Cruise lines
1893 establishments in Norway